C. roseum may refer to:
 Calyptridium roseum, a synonym for Cistanthe rosea, a flowering plant species
 Catasetum roseum, a synonym for Catasetum lemosii, an orchid species

See also
 Roseum (disambiguation)